Kaveh Tehran Basketball Club was an Iranian professional basketball club based in Tehran, Iran. They competed in the Iranian Basketball Super League 2007–08 season.

Notable former players
  Amir Amini
  Saeid Davarpanah
  Mousa Nabipour
  Ivica Jurković
  Omar Sneed

External links
Official website
page on Asia-Basket

Basketball teams in Iran
Sport in Tehran